Zhang Peijun (born April 29, 1958) is a former Chinese handball player.

Zhang won a bronze medal at the 1984 Summer Olympics, where she competed in two matches as a member of the Chinese women's handball team. She is currently a pharmaceutical engineering student at University of Florida.

External links
profile

1958 births
Living people
Chinese female handball players
Handball players at the 1984 Summer Olympics
Olympic handball players of China
Olympic bronze medalists for China
Olympic medalists in handball
Medalists at the 1984 Summer Olympics